David Cassidy Part II – The Remix or Dance Party Remix is a dance album from former teen-idol David Cassidy.  The album was released in 2007 and is a remixed collection of four of his Billboard singles and seven Partridge Family songs in a club music style (with three versions of Come On, Get Happy).

The different names attributed to the album is David Cassidy Part II - The Remix was released as a limited edition.

Tracks
"Come On Get Happy"
"Come On Get Happy - "GoGo" Remix"
"I Think I Love You"
"I'll Meet You Halfway"
"I Can Feel Your Heartbeat"
"I Woke Up In Love This Morning"
"Point Me In The Direction Of Albuquerque"
"Echo Valley 2-6809"
"Rock Me Baby"
"Cherish"
"Could It Be Forever"
"Ricky's Tune"
"Come On Get Happy"

Personnel
David Cassidy (background vocals)
Craig J (guitar, programming)
Cuty Morrison (guitars)
Robin Simone
Melissa Pradun
Joaquina Mitchell
Beth Glick
Anny Rusk (background vocals).

References

2007 albums
David Cassidy albums